The De Bosset Bridge (formerly Drapano Bridge) is a stone bridge built in 1813 over the bay of Argostoli in Kefalonia. At 689.9 meters, it is the longest stone bridge over the sea in the world.

History 

When the Republic of the Ionian Islands was under British patronage, part of the burden of occupation was reimbursed in the form of infrastructure projects. The Swiss engineer Charles de Bosset became island governor in 1810 and put the emphasis of his activity on the road and bridge construction. Numerous connections were shortened with bridges over ravines. The biggest project, however, was the bridge over the Bay of Argostoli to Drapano, which shortened the way to Lixouri and the north of the island. It separates the Koutavos lagoon from the bay.

In 1812 De Bosset presented his idea of a bridge to the island council, which had to confirm the construction. Counterargument was that the bridge could give robbers a slight escape route, since its northern end is (then as today) unpopulated. In a meeting De Bosset struck a sword on the table and proclaimed that if necessary he could cut petty concerns.

First made of wood, the construction was replaced immediately after construction piece by piece by a bridge of sandstone. The bridge pavement is loaded on 16 low stone arches, one of them is filled. On a small man-made island along the bridge is an obelisk monument of British patronage. During the 1953 Ionian earthquake parts of the bridge subsided, after backfilling and straightening of the pavement these damages remain visible from the side until today. In 1970, the bridge was listed as a historical monument.

As the bridge ends relatively centrally in Argostoli, its utility has recently proven to be counterproductive to keeping the through traffic out of the city, successively the bridge was closed in 2009 for heavy goods traffic and then for cars. In 2005, the seismic safety of the bridge was controlled, and an exchange of concrete fillings by sandstone was recommended. From 2011 to 2013, the bridge was renovated and re-opened as a pedestrian bridge. In the course of the restoration, the concrete fillings from 1953 were replaced by sandstone, the asphalt was replaced by paving and the light poles anchored in the sea were replaced by replicas of the original lanterns.

External links 
 I. Papayianni, V. Pachta, A. Alexiou: Study of the constructing materials, techniques and pathology symptoms of the stone bridge DeBosset in Kefalonia. http://www.hms.civil.uminho.pt/events/arch2007/161_168.pdf

Literature 
 Laboratory of Building Materials, A.U.T.H.:  Report for the ‘Evaluation of the results from the analysis of samples of stone and concrete taken from the DeBosset bridge in Kefalonia’, Thessaloniki 2004
 Pitilakis, K.D: Final Report for the ‘Restoration and Consolidation of the historic bridge DeBosset in Argostoli’,  Laboratory  of  soil  mechanics  and  Earthquake  Geotechnical  Engineering,  A.U.T.H. Thessaloniki 2006

References 

Cephalonia
Stone bridges in Greece
1813 works
United States of the Ionian Islands
Buildings and structures in the Ionian Islands (region)